Orcutt is a surname. Notable people with the name include:

Charles Russell Orcutt (1864–1929), American botanist
Ed Orcutt (born 1963), American politician
Guy Orcutt (1917–2006), American econometrician
Maureen Orcutt (1907–2007), American amateur golfer and reporter
William Dana Orcutt (1870-1953), American book designer, typeface designer, historian, and author
William Warren Orcutt (1869–1942), American petroleum geologist